Okinoshima may refer to:

Oki Islands, a group of Japanese islands historically called Okinoshima
 Okinoshima, Shimane, a town on Dōgo Island, Japan
 Okinoshima (Fukuoka), an island part of the Munakata city
 , an island part of Ichikikushikino city
 Okinoshima, a subsequent name of the General Admiral Graf Apraksin surrendered to Imperial Japanese Navy after the Battle of Tsushima in 1905
 Japanese minelayer Okinoshima, an Imperial Japanese Navy minelayer commissioned in 1936 and sunk in 1942